The 2009 Wichita State Shockers baseball team represented Wichita State University in the 2009 NCAA Division I baseball season. The Shockers played their home games at Eck Stadium under 32nd year coach Gene Stephenson.

Previous season
The Shockers entered the year ranked in the top 25. They started off strong winning their first three games, but were swept in their next series against top 10 ranked Long Beach State. After losing those three games the Shockers would win their next 17 games. Through the season the Shockers were ranked as high as fifth. In the Missouri Valley Conference Tournament they would beat both their opponents and would receive an automatic bid to the NCAA Tournament in the Tallahassee Super Regional. Wichita State started in the Stillwater Regional and beat ranked TCU and Oklahoma State. They reached the Super Regional and played against the Florida State Seminoles winning the first, but lost the next two eliminating them from the Tournament.

2008 MLB Draft
The Shockers had ten players drafted in the 2008 MLB draft.

Roster

Preseason

Preseason All-SEC teams
The Shockers had one player selected to the preseason all-Valley team.

Ryan Jones - OF

Alumni Game
The Alumni Game was played on February 15 between the 2009 team and the Alumni players; such as Derek Schermerhorn (graduated in 2007) and Anthony Capra (Drafted in 2008). The 2009 players won 7–1.

Schedule and results

2009 Missouri Valley All Tournament Team

 Cody Lassley - Catcher
 Chance Sossamon - Utility
 Ryan Jones - Designated Hitter
 Ryan Engrav - Outfield
 Jordan Cooper - Pitcher

MVP - Ryan Engrav

References

Wichita State
Wichita State Shockers baseball seasons
Wichita State Shockers
Wichita State
Missouri Valley Conference baseball champion seasons